Joseph J. Esposito (born March 28, 1950) is a former law enforcement officer and civil servant. He is currently the Deputy Commissioner of Enforcement for the New York City Department of Buildings and formerly the Commissioner of New York City Emergency Management from June 27, 2014, until his controversial ousting in November 2018. Prior to that role he was the Chief of Department of the New York City Police Department (NYPD) from 2000 until his retirement from the NYPD in 2013.

Education
Esposito holds a Bachelor of Arts degree in Criminal Justice from the State University of New York.

Career
Esposito entered the NYPD in August 1968 at 18 years old as a Police Trainee. In April 1971, he was appointed a Patrolman, and began his career on patrol in the 77th Precinct in Brooklyn. He was promoted to Detective in May 1983, Sergeant in September 1983, Lieutenant in February 1986, Captain in June 1989, Deputy Inspector in August 1993, Inspector in August 1994, Deputy Chief in September 1996, and Assistant Chief in December 1997. On August 25, 2000, he was promoted to the position of Chief of Department, making him the highest ranking uniformed member of the department. In his career, Esposito has served in numerous commands of the department, including the 77th, 10th, 83rd, 109th, 34th, 66th, and 83rd Precincts, and in the Narcotics Division and the Detective Bureau. In his last assignment before becoming Chief of Department, Esposito was the Commanding Officer of the Strategic and Tactical Command (S.A.T.COM) Brooklyn North. As Chief of Department, Esposito directed and controlled the daily operations of the five major enforcement Bureaus (Patrol Services, Detectives, Transit, Housing, and Organized Crime Control) within the NYPD. He also coordinated the crime control strategy meetings at which commanders share tactical information and recommend plans of action for realizing crime reduction goals. During his career, he earned some of the department's most honored and prestigious awards, including the Combat Cross, the Medal for Valor, and the Exceptional Merit award.

Esposito led the NYPD response to the September 11th attacks. Years later in an interview with WNBC, he described the attacks as the most haunting moment of his career.

During President George W. Bush’s famous visit to Ground Zero days after the attacks, Esposito could be seen amongst the NYPD and FDNY members surrounding the president.

Controversies
In April 2006, New York State Senator Simcha Felder accused Esposito of using inappropriate language when Esposito attempted to quell individuals who entered a police station house during a riot in Borough Park. Felder indicated that he personally heard the chief say, "Get the fucking Jews out of here." However, the Civilian Complaint Review Board, which investigates police misconduct, later found the accusation against Esposito unsubstantiated, but did reprimand Chief Esposito for using profanity. When subsequently asked to comment on the Review Board's finding, Felder's office stated that Felder had "no comment" about the incident and that he "wants to put the matter behind him".

In 2011, Esposito directed the arrests of hundreds of Occupy Wall Street protesters during a march across the Brooklyn Bridge. In the civil litigation that followed, Esposito tried to avoid being deposed in one of the related cases.

In a video taken on St. Patrick's Day in 2012 and later obtained by the Daily News, Esposito was seen shoving protesters and, at least once, using a nightstick to strike a protester.

In September 2012, Esposito was photographed while restraining a slim-build female Occupy Wall Street activist. The photograph was noted in the Letters to the Editor section of the Daily News, since it appeared that Esposito had placed the activist into a "chokehold."

In 2015, the NYPD was accused of destroying evidence related to a federal class action lawsuit regarding the department's alleged practice of issuing "850,000 bogus summonses" according to a quota system. Amongst the e-mails that the department was accused of refusing to deliver to plaintiffs in the lawsuit were communications sent by Esposito regarding the summons' program.

Dates of rank
Sworn in as a Police Trainee - 1968 Appointed as a Patrolman - 1971 Promoted to Detective - 1983  Promoted to Sergeant - 1983  Promoted to Lieutenant - 1986  Promoted to Captain - 1989  Promoted to Deputy Inspector - 1993  Promoted to Inspector - 1994  Promoted to Deputy Chief - 1996  Promoted to Assistant Chief - 1997  Chief of Department - 2000

See also

New York City Police Department
Chief of Police

Notes

New York City Police Department officers
American people of Italian descent
Living people
1950 births
Commissioners in New York City
New York City Emergency Management